Xanthobacter aminoxidans is a bacterium from the family of Xanthobacteraceae which has been isolated from activated sludge in Russia.

References

Further reading

External links
Type strain of Xanthobacter aminoxidans at BacDive -  the Bacterial Diversity Metadatabase

Hyphomicrobiales
Bacteria described in 2003